Ian McCallum may refer to:

 Ian McCallum (guitarist), an English guitarist and songwriter
 Ian McCallum (rugby union), former South African rugby union player